Micallef is a Maltese surname. It has been recorded in Malta since ancient times, and its origins probably lie in the name Micali, a variant of Michael (in Hebrew, Michael means "Who is like God"). However, another possible derivation for the surname is the Maltese word "mħallef", which means 'judge', and thus its origin is not certain. This surname is found in various Medieval records, normally as Makluffi. Prior to the late 15th century, most people bearing this surname were of the Jewish faith.

Recorded in over two hundred spellings, some examples of which are shown below, this is a European medieval surname of crusader, but ultimately biblical origins. Deriving from the ancient Hebrew name "Mich-ael" meaning "He who is like god", it was introduced from the holy land by returning warriors from the various crusades commencing In the 12th century and which continued for several centuries with minimal success. During the period of the Christian Revival at this time, the name rapidly became established at firstly one of the most popular baptismal names, and within a generation as one of the early surnames. Part of this popularity was due to the conviction that the name was originally the war cry of the arcángel, in his defeat of Satan! A large range of spellings have developed in every Christian country of the Western Hemisphere, these spellings include Michael, and Myatt. (England), Mitchell, and Mitchell (Scotland), Miell, Miall, Mitchel, Micheau, and Michel (France), Michele and Micheli (Italy), Miguel (Portugal and Spain), Miell and Michal (Poland), Michel (Hungary), with diminutives Michelet, Michelin (France), mische, Mish, Misisch and Miscke (Germany), Michalik and Mielnik (Poland), Michaley (Czech), Miko (Hungary), and patronymics such as Michaelson, Mikkelson, Mikhalkov, Michaeliewicz, and many more.

People
Andrew Micallef (born 1969), Maltese painter and musician
Corrado Micalef, Canadian, hockey goaltender
Ian Micallef (born 1969), Maltese politician
John Micallef (1923–2003), Maltese philosopher
Luciano Micallef (born 1954), Maltese artist
Richard Micallef (born 1989), Maltese musician, member of Firelight
Roxanne Micallef (born 1997), Maltese footballer
Shaun Micallef, Australian comedian
Constantinous Micallef, Welsh footballer
Joseph R. Micallef (born 1956), Maltese judge
Mario Micallef, Associate Mathematics Professor at Warwick University

References

 

Maltese-language surnames